Lament for Leto is a 1971 mystery detective novel by the British writer Gladys Mitchell. It is the forty fourth in the long-running series of books featuring Mitchell's best known character, the psychoanalyst and amateur detective Mrs Bradley. It is a loose sequel to the 1937 novel Come Away, Death with several of the characters reappearing.

Synopsis
While sheltering from the rain at the British Museum Dame Beatrice Bradley runs into an old archaeologist acquaintance. He invites her to accompany his new expedition to uncover the glories of Ancient Greece. However, when they embark on the journey to the Mediterranean she notices the tensions among the other members of the expedition, particularly driven by the demanding, self-involved novelist Chloe Cowie.

References

Bibliography
 Parker, Peter & Kermode, Frank. The Reader's Companion to the Twentieth-century Novel. Fourth Estate, 1994
 Reilly, John M. Twentieth Century Crime & Mystery Writers. Springer, 2015.

1971 British novels
Novels by Gladys Mitchell
British crime novels
British mystery novels
British thriller novels
Novels set in London
Novels set in Greece
British detective novels
Michael Joseph books